Gustav Mauritz Johansson-Fritzing (19 March 1881 – 7 October 1966) was a Swedish sport shooter who competed in the 1924 Summer Olympics.

In 1924 he won the silver medal as member of the Swedish team in the team running deer, single shots event and the bronze medal in the team running deer, double shots competition. In the 100 metre running deer, single shots event he finished seventh and in the 100 metre running deer, double shots competition he finished 15th.

References

External links
profile

1881 births
1966 deaths
Swedish male sport shooters
Running target shooters
Olympic shooters of Sweden
Shooters at the 1924 Summer Olympics
Olympic silver medalists for Sweden
Olympic bronze medalists for Sweden
Olympic medalists in shooting
Medalists at the 1924 Summer Olympics
People from Jönköping
Sportspeople from Jönköping County
19th-century Swedish people
20th-century Swedish people